Glover v. United States, 531 U.S. 198 (2001), was a United States Supreme Court case decided in 2001. The case dealt with a technical question of law relating to whether a showing of prejudice in incorrect sentencing decisions is required for a correction of that sentence.

Background
Paul Glover was the Vice President and General Counsel of the Chicago Truck Drivers, Helpers, and Warehouse Workers Union. A trial showed that he tried to enrich himself and others through kickbacks. The federal trial court sentenced him to 84 months in prison, denying a request to 'group' consideration of similar offenses on which he was convicted, which would have lowered the sentence range. His attorneys did not raise this issue on his first appeal to the Seventh Circuit, which affirmed his conviction. Glover filed a motion on his own to try to correct his sentence. He argued that the failure of his attorneys to appeal on the grouping question constituted ineffective assistance of counsel. However, because there was no proof that the sentencing alteration was 'significant', the Court of Appeals for the Seventh Circuit affirmed. Glover wanted a lower range (which would have a minimum of 63 months) and so he appealed to the United States Supreme Court which granted the case for consideration in 2000.

Opinion of the Court
Justice Anthony Kennedy wrote the decision of the Court which was unanimous. He stated that the Strickland test's prejudice prong did not require a showing that a wrongful increase in a sentence met 'a standard of significance'. The Seventh Circuit was thus incorrect because "there is no obvious dividing line by which to measure how much longer a sentence must be for the increase to constitute substantial prejudice... although the amount by which a defendant's sentence is increased by a particular decision may be a factor to consider in determining whether counsel's performance in failing to argue the point constitutes ineffective assistance, ...it cannot serve as a bar to a showing of prejudice." Therefore, Glover's sentence had to be recalculated and the case was remanded for further proceedings in lower courts.

See also
 Strickland v. Washington

References

External links

United States Supreme Court cases
2001 in United States case law
United States Sixth Amendment ineffective assistance of counsel case law
United States Supreme Court cases of the Rehnquist Court